Samuel Barton Burdett (born September 30, 1843 in Tyendinaga, Canada West-died January 20, 1892) was a politician, lawyer and lecturer. He was elected to the House of Commons of Canada as a Member in the 1887 election. He was re-elected in the 1891 election then died in office on January 20, 1892. He also served as a councillor for the town of Belleville, Ontario.

External links
 

1843 births
1892 deaths
Liberal Party of Canada MPs
Members of the House of Commons of Canada from Ontario